The 1990–91 Philadelphia Flyers season was the team's 24th season in the National Hockey League (NHL). The Flyers missed the Stanley Cup playoffs for the second consecutive season.

Off-season
After firing general manager Bobby Clarke on April 16, 1990, Russ Farwell was hired to replace him on June 6. Farwell had spent the previous two seasons as the general manager of the Western Hockey League's Seattle Thunderbirds.

Regular season
Rick Tocchet scored 40 goals and Pelle Eklund recorded 50 assists. However, goaltender Ron Hextall continued to be hampered by injuries during the 1990–91 season. He only played in 36 games and as a result the Flyers missed the playoffs for the second consecutive year, finishing fifth in the division and three points short of a playoff spot after a late-season collapse.

Despite scoring the fewest short-handed goals (2) and allowing the most short-handed goals (16), the Flyers finished 7th out of 21 teams in power play percentage with 20.12% (68 for 338).

Season standings

Schedule and results

Regular season

|- style="background:#fcf;"
| 1 || October 4 || @ Boston Bruins || 1–4 || 0–1–0 || 0 || 
|- style="background:#fcf;"
| 2 || October 6 || @ New Jersey Devils || 1–3 || 0–2–0 || 0 || 
|- style="background:#cfc;"
| 3 || October 7 || Detroit Red Wings || 7–2 || 1–2–0 || 2 || 
|- style="background:#cfc;"
| 4 || October 11 || New Jersey Devils || 7–4 || 2–2–0 || 4 || 
|- style="background:#cfc;"
| 5 || October 13 || Winnipeg Jets || 4–3 || 3–2–0 || 6 || 
|- style="background:#cfc;"
| 6 || October 16 || @ Pittsburgh Penguins || 5–1 || 4–2–0 || 8 || 
|- style="background:#cfc;"
| 7 || October 18 || Quebec Nordiques || 5–4 || 5–2–0 || 10 || 
|- style="background:#cfc;"
| 8 || October 20 || @ Montreal Canadiens || 5–3 || 6–2–0 || 12 || 
|- style="background:#fcf;"
| 9 || October 23 || Washington Capitals || 2–6 || 6–3–0 || 12 || 
|- style="background:#fcf;"
| 10 || October 25 || @ New York Rangers || 3–5 || 6–4–0 || 12 || 
|- style="background:#fcf;"
| 11 || October 27 || @ New York Islanders || 2–5 || 6–5–0 || 12 || 
|- style="background:#fcf;"
| 12 || October 30 || Pittsburgh Penguins || 2–6 || 6–6–0 || 12 || 
|-

|- style="background:#cfc;"
| 13 || November 1 || Minnesota North Stars || 6–3 || 7–6–0 || 14 || 
|- style="background:#fcf;"
| 14 || November 3 || Chicago Blackhawks || 1–3 || 7–7–0 || 14 || 
|- style="background:#cfc;"
| 15 || November 4 || @ Toronto Maple Leafs || 7–1 || 8–7–0 || 16 || 
|- style="background:#cfc;"
| 16 || November 6 || @ Winnipeg Jets || 4–2 || 9–7–0 || 18 || 
|- style="background:#fcf;"
| 17 || November 8 || Calgary Flames || 2–8 || 9–8–0 || 18 || 
|- style="background:#cfc;"
| 18 || November 10 || @ Quebec Nordiques || 5–2 || 10–8–0 || 20 || 
|- style="background:#cfc;"
| 19 || November 11 || Vancouver Canucks || 2–0 || 11–8–0 || 22 || 
|- style="background:#ffc;"
| 20 || November 13 || New York Rangers || 1–1 OT || 11–8–1 || 23 || 
|- style="background:#cfc;"
| 21 || November 15 || Montreal Canadiens || 4–1 || 12–8–1 || 25 || 
|- style="background:#fcf;"
| 22 || November 17 || @ New Jersey Devils || 2–3 || 12–9–1 || 25 || 
|- style="background:#fcf;"
| 23 || November 18 || New Jersey Devils || 1–4 || 12–10–1 || 25 || 
|- style="background:#cfc;"
| 24 || November 21 || @ Pittsburgh Penguins || 5–4 || 13–10–1 || 27 || 
|- style="background:#cfc;"
| 25 || November 23 || Toronto Maple Leafs || 4–1 || 14–10–1 || 29 || 
|- style="background:#cfc;"
| 26 || November 25 || New York Islanders || 4–1 || 15–10–1 || 31 || 
|- style="background:#cfc;"
| 27 || November 27 || @ New York Islanders || 5–1 || 16–10–1 || 33 || 
|- style="background:#ffc;"
| 28 || November 28 || @ New Jersey Devils || 5–5 OT || 16–10–2 || 34 || 
|- style="background:#cfc;"
| 29 || November 30 || New York Rangers || 5–1 || 17–10–2 || 36 || 
|-

|- style="background:#fcf;"
| 30 || December 2 || Edmonton Oilers || 3–6 || 17–11–2 || 36 || 
|- style="background:#fcf;"
| 31 || December 6 || Buffalo Sabres || 3–4 || 17–12–2 || 36 || 
|- style="background:#fcf;"
| 32 || December 8 || @ Minnesota North Stars || 0–7 || 17–13–2 || 36 || 
|- style="background:#cfc;"
| 33 || December 9 || @ Chicago Blackhawks || 5–4 || 18–13–2 || 38 || 
|- style="background:#fcf;"
| 34 || December 11 || @ Washington Capitals || 1–4 || 18–14–2 || 38 || 
|- style="background:#ffc;"
| 35 || December 13 || New York Islanders || 2–2 OT || 18–14–3 || 39 || 
|- style="background:#fcf;"
| 36 || December 15 || Detroit Red Wings || 1–3 || 18–15–3 || 39 || 
|- style="background:#cfc;"
| 37 || December 16 || @ Winnipeg Jets || 4–2 || 19–15–3 || 41 || 
|- style="background:#fcf;"
| 38 || December 18 || @ Detroit Red Wings || 1–3 || 19–16–3 || 41 || 
|- style="background:#ffc;"
| 39 || December 20 || New Jersey Devils || 3–3 OT || 19–16–4 || 42 || 
|- style="background:#fcf;"
| 40 || December 22 || @ Hartford Whalers || 0–1 || 19–17–4 || 42 || 
|- style="background:#ffc;"
| 41 || December 23 || Montreal Canadiens || 4–4 OT || 19–17–5 || 43 || 
|- style="background:#cfc;"
| 42 || December 27 || @ Los Angeles Kings || 7–5 || 20–17–5 || 45 || 
|- style="background:#cfc;"
| 43 || December 29 || @ St. Louis Blues || 3–1 || 21–17–5 || 47 || 
|- style="background:#fcf;"
| 44 || December 31 || @ Buffalo Sabres || 2–5 || 21–18–5 || 47 || 
|-

|- style="background:#ffc;"
| 45 || January 4 || @ Washington Capitals || 3–3 OT || 21–18–6 || 48 || 
|- style="background:#fcf;"
| 46 || January 5 || @ New York Islanders || 2–3 || 21–19–6 || 48 || 
|- style="background:#fcf;"
| 47 || January 7 || @ New York Rangers || 2–3 || 21–20–6 || 48 || 
|- style="background:#cfc;"
| 48 || January 12 ||@ Boston Bruins  || 3–1 || 22–20–6 || 50 || 
|- style="background:#fcf;"
| 49 || January 13 || Edmonton Oilers || 3–5 || 22–21–6 || 50 || 
|- style="background:#cfc;"
| 50 || January 15 || Pittsburgh Penguins || 5–4 || 23–21–6 || 52 || 
|- style="background:#cfc;"
| 51 || January 17 || Quebec Nordiques || 5–1 || 24–21–6 || 54 || 
|- style="background:#cfc;"
| 52 || January 22 || Calgary Flames || 4–3 || 25–21–6 || 56 || 
|- style="background:#cfc;"
| 53 || January 24 || Washington Capitals || 6–1 || 26–21–6 || 58 || 
|- style="background:#fcf;"
| 54 || January 26 || @ Hartford Whalers || 3–5 || 26–22–6 || 58 || 
|- style="background:#cfc;"
| 55 || January 31 || Pittsburgh Penguins || 4–2 || 27–22–6 || 60 || 
|-

|- style="background:#fcf;"
| 56 || February 2 || Hartford Whalers || 0–2 || 27–23–6 || 60 || 
|- style="background:#fcf;"
| 57 || February 5 || Los Angeles Kings || 2–3 || 27–24–6 || 60 || 
|- style="background:#fcf;"
| 58 || February 7 || Vancouver Canucks || 1–2 || 27–25–6 || 60 || 
|- style="background:#fcf;"
| 59 || February 10 || @ Washington Capitals || 2–5 || 27–26–6 || 60 || 
|- style="background:#cfc;"
| 60 || February 13 || @ Toronto Maple Leafs || 6–3 || 28–26–6 || 62 || 
|- style="background:#fcf;"
| 61 || February 16 || @ New Jersey Devils || 2–3 || 28–27–6 || 62 || 
|- style="background:#cfc;"
| 62 || February 18 || Chicago Blackhawks || 5–3 || 29–27–6 || 64 || 
|- style="background:#ffc;"
| 63 || February 21 || New York Rangers || 4–4 OT || 29–27–7 || 65 || 
|- style="background:#cfc;"
| 64 || February 23 || @ New York Islanders || 5–3 || 30–27–7 || 67 || 
|- style="background:#cfc;"
| 65 || February 24 || New York Islanders || 4–3 || 31–27–7 || 69 || 
|- style="background:#ffc;"
| 66 || February 26 || @ Minnesota North Stars || 2–2 OT || 31–27–8 || 70 || 
|-

|- style="background:#ffc;"
| 67 || March 2 || St. Louis Blues || 4–4 OT || 31–27–9 || 71 || 
|- style="background:#fcf;"
| 68 || March 4 || @ New York Rangers || 2–6 || 31–28–9 || 71 || 
|- style="background:#fcf;"
| 69 || March 7 || @ Calgary Flames || 2–4 || 31–29–9 || 71 || 
|- style="background:#fcf;"
| 70 || March 8 || @ Edmonton Oilers || 4–5 || 31–30–9 || 71 || 
|- style="background:#fcf;"
| 71 || March 12 || @ Los Angeles Kings || 0–6 || 31–31–9 || 71 || 
|- style="background:#cfc;"
| 72 || March 13 || @ Vancouver Canucks || 5–4 OT || 32–31–9 || 73 || 
|- style="background:#fcf;"
| 73 || March 16 || @ Washington Capitals || 0–6 || 32–32–9 || 73 || 
|- style="background:#fcf;"
| 74 || March 17 || Boston Bruins || 1–3 || 32–33–9 || 73 || 
|- style="background:#fcf;"
| 75 || March 21 || St. Louis Blues || 1–4 || 32–34–9 || 73 || 
|- style="background:#cfc;"
| 76 || March 23 || New York Rangers || 7–4 || 33–34–9 || 75 || 
|- style="background:#fcf;"
| 77 || March 24 || @ Buffalo Sabres || 2–6 || 33–35–9 || 75 || 
|- style="background:#fcf;"
| 78 || March 26 || Pittsburgh Penguins || 1–3 || 33–36–9 || 75 || 
|- style="background:#fcf;"
| 79 || March 28 || Washington Capitals || 0–3 || 33–37–9 || 75 || 
|- style="background:#ffc;"
| 80 || March 30 || @ Pittsburgh Penguins || 4–4 OT || 33–37–10 || 76 || 
|-

|-
|Legend:

Player statistics

Scoring
 Position abbreviations: C = Center; D = Defense; G = Goaltender; LW = Left Wing; RW = Right Wing
  = Joined team via a transaction (e.g., trade, waivers, signing) during the season. Stats reflect time with the Flyers only.
  = Left team via a transaction (e.g., trade, waivers, release) during the season. Stats reflect time with the Flyers only.

Goaltending

Awards and records

Awards

Records

Among the team records set during the 1990–91 season was the fewest shorthanded goals scored in a season (2) and the most shorthanded goals allowed in a season (16).

Transactions
The Flyers were involved in the following transactions from May 25, 1990, the day after the deciding game of the 1990 Stanley Cup Finals, through May 25, 1991, the day of the deciding game of the 1991 Stanley Cup Finals.

Trades

Players acquired

Players lost

Signings

Draft picks

NHL Entry Draft
Philadelphia's picks at the 1990 NHL Entry Draft, which was held at BC Place in Vancouver, British Columbia on June 16, 1990. The Flyers traded their fourth-round pick, 67th overall, to the Edmonton Oilers for Normand Lacombe on January 5, 1990.

NHL Supplemental Draft
Philadelphia's picks at the 1990 NHL Supplemental Draft on June 15, 1990.

Farm teams
The Flyers were affiliated with the Hershey Bears of the AHL.

Notes

References
General
 
 
 
Specific

1990–91 NHL season by team
1990–91 in American ice hockey by team
1990
Philadelphia
Philadelphia